The Borough of Broxbourne is a local government district and borough in Hertfordshire, England. Its council is based in Cheshunt. Other towns include Broxbourne, Hoddesdon and Waltham Cross. The eastern boundary of the district is the River Lea.

The borough was formed on 1 April 1974 by the merger of Cheshunt and Hoddesdon urban districts.

In Broxbourne borough, the Metropolitan Green Belt protects the surrounding countryside. The west of Broxbourne borough extends over well-wooded countryside to include Goffs Oak and the popular Lee Valley Park which marks the eastern boundary. Although urbanised with industrial and commercial activity, the whole area retains much of its rural character and is liked by people commuting to London. Most of Broxbourne is classified as part of the Greater London Urban Area.

The borough is twinned with the Sicilian city of Sutera.

Politics

The Council consists of 30 elected members, representing ten electoral wards.  All ten wards elect three councillors each.

The council is currently controlled by the Conservatives, who hold 26 of the 30 seats.  Labour hold three seats all in the Waltham Cross ward, and there is one independent councillor.

The Conservatives have controlled the council since the first election in 1973, making it the nineteenth safest in the country.

Wards 

Broxbourne consists of ten wards:

 Hoddesdon North
 Hoddesdon Town & Rye Park
 Broxbourne & Hoddesdon South
 Wormley & Turnford
 Rosedale & Bury Green
 Goffs Oak
 Cheshunt North
 Cheshunt South & Theobalds
 Flamstead End
 Waltham Cross

Arms

Business

There are 600 companies in the borough, with warehousing and distribution sectors being particularly well represented. The main industrial areas are around Waltham Cross and the Essex Road area of Hoddesdon. The employers with over 250 employees include: Fitzpatrick PLC in Hoddesdon (civil engineers); J Sainsbury also in Hoddesdon; Marks & Spencer, Turnford Retailers; Merck Sharp & Dohme in Hoddesdon involved in pharmaceutical research. Tesco previously had a national headquarters at Delamere Road, Cheshunt but this has now moved to Welwyn Garden City.

The Borough of Broxbourne at Park Plaza Waltham Cross is also home to the world's largest printing plant, which produces publications for News International including The Sun, The Times and The Sun on Sunday (formerly the News of the World). Employing 200 people on a  site to produce 86,000 newspapers per hour on each of its twelve printing presses (a total capacity of over 1,000,000 newspapers per hour), the plant cost £350 million and replaced the News International press in Wapping.

References

External links

Broxbourne Council
Broxbourne population change through time

 
Districts of Hertfordshire
Boroughs in England